Vijay K. Goel is an American engineer, currently the Distinguished University Professor and McMaster-Gardner Endowed Chair at University of Toledo.

References

Year of birth missing (living people)
Living people
21st-century American engineers
University of Toledo faculty